Laufey Lín Jónsdóttir (born April 23, 1999), known by the mononym Laufey , is an Icelandic singer-songwriter and multi-instrumentalist who became popular in the early 2020s. She describes her musical style, a mixture of jazz pop and bedroom pop, as modern jazz.

Laufey participated in The Voice Iceland in 2015. She released her debut EP Typical of Me in 2021, before releasing her debut album Everything I Know About Love in 2022.

Early life and education
Laufey Lín Jónsdottír was born on April 23, 1999. Her father is Icelandic and her mother is Chinese. Her Chinese family is from Guangzhou. Her mother is a classical violinist and her grandfather, Lin Yaoji, was a violin educator at the Central Conservatory of Music in China, which Laufey credits as partly inspiring her love of music. She has an identical twin sister who goes by the name of Junia Jonsdottir. She spent her childhood moving between Reykjavík and Washington, D.C.

At age 15, she performed as a cello soloist with the Iceland Symphony Orchestra. Although she was influenced by and played classical music from an early age, she turned to her father's records of female jazz musicians such as Ella Fitzgerald and Billie Holiday to develop her musical style.

While in Iceland, Laufey participated in the 2014 season of Ísland Got Talent—the Icelandic version of America's Got Talent—and ended as a finalist. The following year, she also appeared as a contestant on The Voice Iceland and reached the semi-finals. At the time, she was the youngest competitor in the series' history.

Laufey graduated from the Berklee College of Music in 2021. She currently resides in Los Angeles.

Career
Laufey released her debut single, "Street by Street", in 2020 and it charted at #1 on Icelandic Radio. She launched her first EP, Typical of Me, on April 30, 2021. It includes "Street by Street" and six new songs. Many of these tracks were written in her college dorm room. Rolling Stone particularly praised her rendition of "I Wish You Love". American Songwriter included the EP in their list of best albums of 2021. Additionally, Typical of Me received attention from musicians such as Willow Smith and Billie Eilish.

Laufey performed in the London Jazz Festival in November 2021. Around the same time, she collaborated with London's Philharmonia Orchestra to release "Let You Break My Heart Again". In December 2021, she collaborated with Dodie to release another single, "Love To Keep Me Warm", a cover of the original by Irving Berlin.

Laufey hosts a weekly music show on BBC Radio 3 called Happy Harmonies, where she highlights uplifting music in a wide variety of genres. She also has a significant following on TikTok, where she frequently hosts live sessions.

She made her United States network television debut when she appeared as the musical guest on Jimmy Kimmel Live! on January 21, 2022. She played her song "Like The Movies" from her debut EP, Typical of Me. Her debut album, Everything I Know About Love, was released on August 26, 2022 via AWAL to critical acclaim.

Discography

Studio albums

Live albums

Extended plays

Singles

References

1999 births
Icelandic women singer-songwriters
Bedroom pop musicians
21st-century classical pianists
Women jazz singers
Jazz-pop singers
Women jazz guitarists
Women jazz pianists
Living people
TikTokers
21st-century Icelandic women singers
21st-century pianists
Icelandic people of Asian descent
Icelandic expatriates in the United States
Icelandic cellists
21st-century cellists
21st-century women pianists